David Yelldell (born October 1, 1981) is an American former professional soccer player who played as a goalkeeper and serves as an assistant coach for Sonnenhof Großaspach. Although he was born in Stuttgart, Germany, he was capped for the United States national team.

Club career
Yelldell was the first choice goalkeeper for TuS Koblenz until suffering a knee ligament injury which kept him out of the final four matches of the 2009–10 2. Bundesliga season, when the club were relegated to the 3. Liga.

He signed with MSV Duisburg before the 2010–11 season and made his competitive debut for the club in a first round DFB-Pokal match against VfB Lübeck on August 13, 2010.

The next season saw him signing with Bundesliga giants Bayer Leverkusen. He made his debut and sole competitive appearance for the club in a first round DFB-Pokal match, a 4–3 surprise defeat at Dynamo Dresden on July 30, 2011.

International career
Born to a German mother and an African American father who was in the U.S. military, Yelldell holds dual citizenship and would have been eligible to play international soccer for either the United States or Germany. He was first called up by the US team in 2011 for a friendly against Argentina. He earned his first national team cap three days later, on March 29, 2011, in another friendly against Paraguay, replacing Marcus Hahnemann at half time. Despite not conceding during his time of play, the US lost this meeting 1–0.

Career statistics

References

External links

  
 
 
 

1981 births
Living people
Footballers from Stuttgart
Citizens of the United States through descent
American soccer players
German footballers
Association football goalkeepers
American people of German descent
German people of American descent
German people of African-American descent
2. Bundesliga players
3. Liga players
Stuttgarter Kickers II players
Blackburn Rovers F.C. players
Brighton & Hove Albion F.C. players
Stuttgarter Kickers players
TuS Koblenz players
MSV Duisburg players
Bayer 04 Leverkusen players
Bayer 04 Leverkusen II players
SG Sonnenhof Großaspach players
English Football League players
German expatriate footballers
Expatriate footballers in England
German expatriate sportspeople in England
United States men's international soccer players